Jeet is a 1972 Indian Hindi-language crime drama film directed and produced by Adurthi Subba Rao. It was a remake of his own 1967 Telugu film Poola Rangadu, which itself was based on the novel Beyond This Place by A. J. Cronin's novel.

Plot 
Ratan (Randhir Kapoor) is an illiterate horse carriage driver, who has dedicated his life to provide for his sister, Padma's (Hina Kauser) education. He meets with a gypsy girl Koyli (Babita), and falls for her. She eventually also falls in love with him. Her brother, Shankar (Roopesh Kumar) is smitten by Padma, but Ratan will not hear of him marrying his sister. Padma does finish her education with honors, and goes off to the city to attend college, there she meets with rich and wealthy Prasad (Jateen) and both fall in love. Back home, Ratan has to work day and night to order to meet with Padma's educational expenses. Prasad introduces Padma to his mom (Sulochana), who approves of her immediately. When the family attempts to finalize a marriage date, they find out about Ratan's profession, which they frown upon, but are shocked to know that her father is in prison for murder.

Cast 
 Randhir Kapoor as Ratan / Ramu
 Babita as Koyli / Rasili
 Jeevan as Dayaram
 Rajendra Nath as Bablu
 Roopesh Kumar as Shankar
 Heena Kausar as Padma
 Anwar Hussain as Dharamdev
 Nana Palsikar as Ramdas
 Hari Shivdasani as Purushottam

Soundtrack

References

External links 
 
 

1970s Hindi-language films
1972 drama films
1972 films
Films directed by Adurthi Subba Rao
Films scored by Laxmikant–Pyarelal
Hindi remakes of Telugu films
Hindi-language drama films
Indian thriller drama films